Óscar Omar Miguez Antón (5 December 1927 – 19 August 2006) was a Uruguayan footballer who played as a forward. He was part of the Uruguay team in the 1950 and 1954 World Cups, where he played as a striker, and is Uruguay's all-time record World Cup goalscorer with eight goals.

He played club football for Peñarol, and finished his career with Sporting Cristal.

Omar Miguez scored five times for his country on the way to a World Cup winners medal in 1950. He played all four games Uruguay played, scoring a hat-trick against Bolivia in an 8–0 win in the play-off for the final group. He struck the other two against Sweden in the last fifteen minutes of their in the final group, turning the tie around to win 3–2. These goals turned out to be decisive for the Uruguayans, as their subsequent sensational defeat of Brazil would have been useless, had it not been for the victory against Sweden. He also played in the other two final group games against Spain and Brazil.

He also played in the 1954 World Cup. He scored three times in the group stage, once in a 2–0 win over Czechoslovakia and twice in a 7–0 win over Scotland. He also played in the quarter-final, defeating England 4–2, but was injured for Uruguay's defeats in the semi-final (4–2 a.e.t. against Hungary) and the third-place play-off (3–1 against Austria). From 1950–1958 he played 39 times scoring 27 goals which makes him the top 5th goalscorer for his country, only needing 4 goals to break the record.

He died in 2006 at the age of 78. His remains are buried at the Cementerio del Buceo, Montevideo.

Career statistics

International
Source:

References

External links

1927 births
2006 deaths
Uruguayan footballers
Uruguay international footballers
FIFA World Cup-winning players
1950 FIFA World Cup players
1954 FIFA World Cup players
Uruguayan Primera División players
Peñarol players
Sporting Cristal footballers
Uruguayan expatriate footballers
Expatriate footballers in Peru
Uruguayan expatriate sportspeople in Peru
Footballers from Montevideo
Burials at Cementerio del Buceo, Montevideo
Copa América-winning players
Association football forwards